Sipaayi is a 2016 Indian Kannada-language action film directed by Rajath Mayee, in his directorial debut. The film stars newbie Siddharth Mahesh, who also produced the film, opposite Sruthi Hariharan, while Sanchari Vijay, Achyuth Kumar, Gaurish Akki, Krishna Hebbale and Bharath Singh appear in supporting roles.

Plot
The protagonist, a TV reporter, fights to stop illegal activities around the city.

Cast
 Sidharth Mahesh as Siddharth
 Sruthi Hariharan as Divya
 Sanchari Vijay as Manju
 Achyuth Kumar as Narasimharaju
 Gaurish Akki as Vishwanath
 Krishna Hebbale as Virat
 Bharath Singh as Abhay

Production
Rajath Mayee and Siddharth Mahesh met on the sets of Lucia as they both were coproducers of the film. Sruthi Hariharan, who starred in Lucia, was cast in this film. Production started on 19 May 2014. Completed shoot with the song shoot on 4 July 2015.

Soundtrack

B. Ajaneesh Loknath composed the soundtrack of Sipaayi. The lyrics were written by Jayant Kaikini, Hrudaya Shiva, Chethan Kumar and Bharath Venkataswamy. B. Ajaneesh Loknath, Nanditha, Chinmayi, Shashank Sheshagiri, Bobby CR and Udith Haritas lent their voices for the songs. Audio released on 20 May 2016.

References

External links 

2016 films
2010s Kannada-language films
Indian action films
2016 action films